Community education, also known as community-based education or community learning & development, is an organization's programs to promote learning and social development work with individuals and groups in their communities using a range of formal and informal methods. A common defining feature is that programmes and activities are developed in dialogue with communities and participants. The purpose of community learning and development is to develop the capacity of individuals and groups of all ages through their actions, the capacity of communities, to improve their quality of life. Central to this is their ability to participate in democratic processes.

Community education encompasses all those occupations and approaches that are concerned with running education and development programmes within local communities, rather than within educational institutions such as schools, colleges and universities. The latter is known as the formal education system, whereas community education is sometimes called informal education. It has long been critical of aspects of the formal education system for failing large sections of the population in all countries and had a particular concern for taking learning and development opportunities out to poorer areas, although it can be provided more broadly.

There are a myriad of job titles and employers include public authorities and voluntary or non-governmental organisations, funded by the state and by independent grant making bodies. Schools, colleges and universities may also support community learning and development through outreach work within communities. The community schools movement has been a strong proponent of this since the sixties. Some universities and colleges have run outreach adult education programmes within local communities for decades. Since the seventies the prefix word ‘community’ has also been adopted by several other occupations from youth workers and health workers to planners and architects, who work with more disadvantaged groups and communities and have been influenced by community education and community development approaches.

Community educators have over many years developed a range of skills and approaches for working within local communities and in particular with disadvantaged people. These include less formal educational methods, community organising and group work skills. Since the nineteen sixties and seventies through the various anti poverty programmes in both developed and developing countries, practitioners have been influenced by structural analyses as to the causes of disadvantage and poverty i.e. inequalities in the distribution of wealth, income, land etc. and especially political power and the need to mobilise people power to effect social change. Thus the influence of such educators as Paulo Friere and his focus upon this work also being about politicising the poor.

In the history of community education and community learning and development, the UK has played a significant role in hosting the two main international bodies representing community education and community development. These being the International Community Education Association, which was for many years based at the Community Education Development Centre based in Coventry UK. ICEA and CEDC have now closed, and the International Association for Community Development, which still has its HQ in Scotland. In the 1990s there was some thought as to whether these two bodies might merge. The term community learning and development has not taken off widely in other countries. Although community learning and development approaches are recognised internationally. These methods and approaches have been acknowledged as significant for local social, economic, cultural, environmental and political development by such organisations as the UN, WHO, OECD, World Bank, Council of Europe and EU.

In the UK

In the UK, the term community learning and development has now been widely adopted as describing a discrete employment sector of occupations concerned with outreach education and development work in local communities. In 1999, a UK-wide organisation responsible for setting professional training standards for education and development practitioners working within local communities  was established. This organisation was called PAULO – the National Training Organisation for Community Learning and Development. (It was named after Paulo Freire.) It was formally recognised by David Blunket, the Secretary of State for Education and Employment in the New Labour Government in January 1999. It brought together a range of occupational interests under a single national training standards body, these being, adult education, youth work, community development and development education. The inclusion of community development was significant as it was initially uncertain as to whether it would join the NTO for Social Care.

The Community Learning and Development NTO represented all the main employers, trades unions, professional associations and national development agencies working in this area across the four nations of the UK. This was the first time that the informal education occupations across the UK had ever come together with the common purpose of creating a publicly recognised occupational sector, in the way that school teachers or college lecturers had long been publicly and officially recognised.

The term 'community learning and development' was adopted to acknowledge that all of these occupations worked primarily within local communities, and that this work encompassed not just providing less formal learning support but also a concern for the wider holistic development of those communities – socio-economically, environmentally, culturally and politically. In effect this brought together for the first time two traditions. The former group of occupations – adult educators, youth workers and community education workers had tended to focus upon the provision of informal education support for individuals and groups within communities. They had always seen their work as being educational. The latter group – community workers, community development workers and development educators had tended to focus upon the socio-economic and environmental development of those communities. Both sets of occupations recognised that they shared very similar values, knowledge base and skill sets and that what brought them together was a common commitment to supporting learning and social action.

By bringing together these occupational groups this created for the first time a single recognised employment sector of nearly 300,000 full and part-time paid staff within the UK, approximately 10% of these staff being full-time. The NTO continued to recognise the range of different occupations within it, for example specialists who work primarily with young people, but all agreed that they shared a core set of professional approaches to their work.

In 2002 the New Labour Government announced that it wished to cluster NTOs, of which there were over 50 covering a wide range of occupations across the UK labour market, under a smaller number of what they called Sector Skills Councils. A Sector Skills Council was formed called the Lifelong Learning UK Sector Skills Council. PAULO became one of five discrete pillars within LLUK, the others being the former NTOs for Further Education, for Universities, for Library and information Services and for Work Based Education. Over nearly a decade LLUK did a large amount of labour market mapping, as well as setting standards for the professional training of people working in the CLD area and generally promoted the identity of this sector across wider UK public policies and the public, non governmental and private sector employers.

All Sector Skills Councils in the UK including LLUK were abolished by the Conservative/Liberal coalition Government in 2011 and at the time of writing it is uncertain as to whether a single body representing the professional community learning and development sector will be sustained. The Community and Youth Workers Union which is part of the Unite Union in the UK played the lead role in improving employee’s conditions across the sector but never succeeded in representing all employees within the CLD sector and is not widely represented across all parts of the UK.

The Scottish Government has continued to recognise community learning and development as a discrete employment sector, and has for over a decade supported CLD training for people wishing to work professionally in this area. There is a team of HMI (Her Majesties Inspectors) to inspect the quality of delivery by employers. In 2007 the Scottish Government established a Scottish Standards Council for Community Learning and Development. This organisation oversees quality standards in the professional training of staff working in this field, including the validation and endorsement of professional training courses and is introducing a professional registration scheme for such qualified practitioners. It has continued much of the work of the former LLUK as it operated in Scotland.

At the present time similar CLD Standards Councils have not been set up in other parts of the UK and it does appear that the sector outside Scotland is once again becoming more fragmented. Unlike the formal education sector there is virtually no legislation in the UK underpinning the need to provide and fund community learning and development. Consequently, it has been vulnerable to cuts in public expenditure due to the recession, particularly projects that were seen as too radical.

National priorities 

Three national priorities have been developed for community learning and development in Scotland:

Achievement through learning for adults
Raising standards of achievement in learning for adults through community-based lifelong learning opportunities incorporating the core skills of literacy, numeracy, communications, working with others, problem solving and information communications technology (ICT).

Achievement through learning for young people
Engaging with young people to facilitate their personal, social and educational development and enable them to gain a voice, influence and place in society.

Achievement through building community capacity
Building community capacity and influence by enabling people to develop the confidence, understanding and skills required to influence decision making and service delivery.

Principles and competences 

Competent CLD workers will ensure that their work supports social change and social justice and is based on the values of CLD. Their approach is collaborative, anti-discriminatory and equalities-focused and they work with diverse individuals, communities of place or interest when this is or is not appropriate. Central to their practice is challenging discrimination and its consequences and working with individuals and communities to shape learning and development activities that enhance quality of life and sphere of influence. They have good interpersonal and listening skills and their practice demonstrates that they value and respect the knowledge, experience and aspirations of those involved.

The Scottish Government have introduced the following set of principles of which community learning and development related activities should be based on:

 Empowerment – increasing the ability of individuals and groups to influence issues that affect them and their communities;
 Participation – supporting people to take part in decision making;
 Inclusion, equality of opportunity and anti-discrimination – recognising that some people may need additional support to overcome the barriers they face;
 Self-determination – supporting the right of people to make their own choices; and
Partnership – recognising that many agencies can contribute to CLD to ensure resources are used effectively.

Wisconsin Model 

A philosophical base for developing Community Education programs is provided through the five components of the Wisconsin Model of Community Education. The model provides a process framework for local school districts to implement or strengthen community education. A set of Community Education Principles was developed by Larry Horyna and Larry Decker for the National Coalition for Community Education in 1991
 These include:

 Self-determination: Local people are in the best position to identify community needs and wants. Parents, as children's first and most important teachers, have both a right and a responsibility to be involved in their children's education.
 Self-help: People are best served when their capacity to help themselves is encouraged and enhanced. When people assume ever-increasing responsibility for their own well being, they acquire independence rather than dependence.
 Leadership Development: The identification, development, and use of the leadership capacities of local citizens are prerequisites for ongoing self-help and community improvement efforts.
 Localization: Services, programs, events, and other community involvement opportunities that are brought closest to where people live have the greatest potential for a high level of public participation. Whenever possible, these activities should be decentralized to locations of easy public access.
 Integrated Delivery of Services: Organizations and agencies that operate for the public good can use their limited resources, meet their own goals, and better serve the public by establishing close working relationships with other organizations and agencies with related purposes.
 Maximum Use of Resources: The physical, financial, and human resources of every community should be interconnected and used to their fullest if the diverse needs and interests of the community are to be met.
 Inclusiveness: The segregation or isolation of people by age, income, sex, race, ethnicity, religion, or other factors inhibits the full development of the community. Community programs, activities, and services, should involve the broadest possible cross section of community residents.
 Responsiveness: Public institutions have a responsibility to develop programs and services that respond to the continually changing needs and interests of their constituents.
 Lifelong Learning: Learning begins at our birth and continues until death.  Formal and informal learning opportunities should be available to residents of all ages in a wide variety of community settings.

Role of the professional

The role of a community learning and development professional depends somewhat on the career path followed. For example, someone working with young people may have different priorities than someone working with adults; however, the outcomes are very similar in a sense that both will be aiming to promote a more socially just and equal society. Community learning and development is a vast field of work and the range of job categories is wide and may include the following: Youth Information Worker, Detached Youth Worker, Community Arts Worker, Community Capacity Worker, Local Authority Community Planning Officer, etc.

Community learning and development workers should see themselves as working with people, rather than for them. Empathy is crucial to understanding the issues faced by those they work with and it is important that they engage in a way that does not intimidate people or place the worker in a position of looking down on those they work with.

The role of a Community learning and development worker is largely different from the role of a formal educator such as a teacher. Community learning and development workers do not follow a curriculum, as they allow the people they work with to form their own way of learning and each individual is believed to have the ability to reach their full potential in life. A community learning and development approach is arguably a more effective way of learning as every individual has their own unique way to learn and community learning and development workers look for the best possible method that suits the individual. Community learning and development approaches are gradually being adopted in schools to some extent and many other agencies and using a community learning and development approach in their work.

In Canada, a university in Alberta has created a Community-based Bachelor of Education program to prepare teachers for rural community education, making it the first university program in Canada that aims at preparing teachers for rural community education.

Qualifications 

Professional community educators or community learning and development workers usually hold a professional degree in community education or community learning and development, depending on the course offered at the university from which they graduate. In Scotland, qualifications may be Approved by the Standards Council for Community Learning and Development. This means that the course has been assessed by a group of peers - an Approval Panel. The course must have a practice element totalling 40% of the course to gain Approval. More details on the Approval Process and a list of Approved qualifications are available on the Standards Council website www.cldstandardscouncil.org.uk In order to gain entrance to this course, a history of voluntary work is usually desirable.

Many of those working in the field of community learning and development will be doing so voluntarily. These people are usually encouraged to complete a work-place based alternative to the full-time degree course. Others in paid positions may hold qualifications relevant to the field. These people will also be encouraged to study for a degree in community education.

Some university institutions offer post-graduate degrees in community education such as MA, MSc, PGDip, PGCert, etc.

Participatory democracy

Youth participation
In countries where democratic governments exist, people are encouraged to vote for someone to represent them. In today's society there is a dwindling interest in politics from our younger generation and this could have a negative effect on our democracy and political system in years to come. Community learning and development has the potential to encourage young people to become more interested in politics and helping them influence decisions that affect their lives.

In many parts of the world, youth parliament-style organisations have been set up to allow young people to debate issues that affect them and others in their community. Young people engage with these organisations voluntarily and are sometimes elected using a democratic system of voting. Young people are at the heart of these organisations and are usually involved in the management and development. The majority of these organisations are facilitated and staffed by workers trained in community learning and development; however, staff role is mainly to facilitate and be supportive but not intrusive.

These organisations allow young people to gain a voice, influence decision makers who affect their lives and provide them with a sense of self-worth and a place in society.

In the United Kingdom, examples of these organisations include the United Kingdom Youth Parliament (UKYP); in Scotland, the Scottish Youth Parliament (SYP); in Wales the Children & Young People's Assembly for Wales; and in Northern Ireland, the Northern Ireland Youth Forum. In Canada, examples include Youth Parliament of Manitoba (YPM), Saskatchewan Youth Parliament (SYP), TUXIS Parliament of Alberta (TUXIS), and British Columbia Youth Parliament (BCYP).

Parental participation 
Cultural divides and deficit thinking creates mutual distrust between marginalized parents and schools which in turn creates barriers to active parental involvement of marginalized parents in the education of their children. Researches also show that parents of high socio-economic status play active and direct role in the education of their children and are more likely to influence school policies that affects their children's schooling whereas parents of low socio-economic status play indirect roles in the education of their children and are less likely to influence school policies that affects their children's schooling. The gap between parents' educational involvement among parents from higher socio-economic status and parents from lower socio-economic status results in a more personalized education that caters for the needs of children from higher socio-economic backgrounds and more alienating and generic education systems/policies for students from low socio-economic backgrounds.

The following practices are necessary for parent and community participation in the education of their wards to be effective; students come to school healthy and ready to learn, parents assist schools with financial and or material support, there are frequent communications between parents and school authorities, parents have meaningful authorities in the schools and they also assist in the teaching of their children. Parents' home based educational involvement such as creating an enabling learning environment at home, helping their children with their assignments, helping their children develop cognitive skills and other school skills and motivating their children to do well in school supports student success. Researches show that multimodal and effective migrant parental involvement in the education of their children increases the test scores of such students and also shows strong student success even after academic abilities and socio-economic status are taken into consideration.

School officials' racial stereotypes , class stereotypes, biases and attitudes regarding parental involvement in the education of their children hinders school officials from involving parents as partners in the education of their children. Also, bureaucracies in the public education systems hinders parents from advocating for changes that would benefit their children. Formally organized parental associations in schools that seeks to increase parental involvement, ignore the cultural and socio-economic needs of minorities, thereby  contributing to the barriers of parental involvement, especially for marginalized parents. Research shows that high number of marginalized parents do not actively engage in their children's schooling. There is also a wide gap between the rhetoric of best parental involvement practices and actual parental involvement practices. Effective parental Involvement in the education of their children involves; parenting, communication, volunteering, home tutoring, involvement in decision-making, and collaboration with the community. Effective Parental Involvement treats and or makes school officials and parents partners in the education of their children.

See also 
 Community development
 Lifelong learning
 Youth Bank

References

External links

Further reading 

 
 

Educational stages
Adult education